The 2014–15 Jordan FA Cup is the 35th season of the national football competition of Jordan. The winners of the competition will earn a spot in the 2016 AFC Cup.

The 12 teams from the Jordan Premier League will start in a group stage at round one. Six teams in two groups, with the top four sides progressing to the Quarter finals.

Group stage

Group A

Group B

Quarter-finals

1st Leg

2nd Leg

Al-Faisaly advance 3:2 on aggregate

Al-Wehdat advance 1:0 on aggregate

That Ras advance 4:3 on Penalties

Al-Ramtha advance 3:2 on aggregate

Semi finals

1st Leg

2nd Leg

That Ras advance on aggregate

Al-Faisaly advance 6:1 on aggregate

Final

References

External links

Jordan FA Cup seasons
Jordan
Cup